Nepomucena Kostecka, née Żółkowska (24 November 1807 – 10 March 1847) was a Polish stage actress. She belonged to the more noted artists on the Polish stage of her time.

Nepomucena Kostecka was the daughter of the comedian actor Fortunat Alojzy Gonzaga Żółkowski (1777–1822) and half-sister of the actors Alojzy Gonzaga Jazon Żółkowski and Lucjan Żółkowski. She debuted on 20 September 1829 and was active until 5 February 1847, a month before her death, when she played the part of a Jew in Rejci Station postal Hulczy. She performed in both Warsaw and Krakow.

She married the actor Tomasz Kostecki (occurring mainly in the chorus of the Warsaw Government Theatre) and had five children. According to the critic , she was an outstanding character actor, outstanding in higher comedy and free of exaggeration.

References 
 Stanisław Szenic, Cmentarz Powązkowski 1790-1850. Zmarli i ich rodziny, Warszawa 1979

19th-century Polish actresses
1807 births
1847 deaths